The 1972 Asian Basketball Confederation Championship for Women were held in Taipei, Republic of China.

Preliminary round

Final round

Semifinals

3rd place

Final

Final standing

Awards

See also
 List of sporting events in Taiwan

References
 Results
 archive.fiba.com

1972
1972 in women's basketball
women
International women's basketball competitions hosted by Taiwan
B